The Hessian Rhön Nature Park lies east of Fulda in East Hesse on the border with Thuringia and Bavaria and has and area of 720,7 km².  Together with the Bavarian Rhön Nature Park it is part of the cross-border Rhön Biosphere Reserve.

Landscape
The nature park lies between the mountain and hill ranges of the Spessart, Vogelsberg, Thuringian Forest, Haßberge and Steigerwald. It is characterised by mixed forest, rivers, lakes like the Guckaisee, moors, grassland and dry biotopes.

See also 
 Rhön Mountains
 List of nature parks in Germany
 Bavarian Rhön Nature Park

References

External links 
Rhön Nature Park
Rhön Biosphere Reserve
Rhön Photograph Gallery

Rhoen
 
East Hesse